Alex Tschui (born 6 February 1939) is a Swiss modern pentathlete. He competed at the 1968 Summer Olympics.

References

External links
 

1939 births
Living people
Swiss male modern pentathletes
Olympic modern pentathletes of Switzerland
Modern pentathletes at the 1968 Summer Olympics
People from Solothurn
Sportspeople from the canton of Solothurn